John Morice or John Morrice may refer to:

John Morice (died 1362), Lord Chancellor of Ireland
John Morice (1568–1618), MP for Appleby (UK Parliament constituency)
John Morice (1630–1705), MP for Newport (Cornwall) (UK Parliament constituency)
John Morrice (1811–1875), New South Wales politician

See also
John Morris (disambiguation)